Orthomegas monnei is a species of beetle in the family Cerambycidae. It is found in south-eastern Mexico and Costa Rica.

References

Beetles described in 1993
Prioninae